The Madison Muskies were a Class A minor league baseball team that played in the Midwest League from 1982 to 1993 in Madison, Wisconsin.
In 1993, the team relocated to Comstock Park, Michigan and became today's West Michigan Whitecaps. The Muskies were an affiliate of the Oakland Athletics. The team, which was founded by former Rochester Red Wing GM and announcer of professional baseball's longest game  Bob Drew and Linda Drew played at Breese Stevens Field and Warner Park.

The debut Muskies team had a league-best 87–52 record, 6.5 games ahead of the Appleton Foxes in the North Division, however, they lost the Midwest League championship to the Foxes 2 games to 1. Romano, a Muskies outfielder, was the Midwest League Most Valuable Player in 1982. In 1991, they made their second and last championship appearance, this time losing to the Clinton Giants 3 games to 0.

The Muskies played their last home game in Madison against the Foxes in 1993. In a driving rainstorm, with Appleton leading 5–3 in the bottom of the ninth inning, the Foxes' pitcher slipped on the mound and his manager requested that the game be called. After a second slip, the umpire called the game, ending the Muskies' Madison tenure in anticlimactic fashion: Madison's final home game ended with one out in the bottom of the ninth, with the potential tying run coming to bat.

They finished their 12-year run in Madison with an 860–786 record, .522 winning percentage, including three division titles and four second-place finishes.

Notable Madison alumni

 Tim Belcher (1984) 
 Scott Brosius (1988) MLB All-Star; 1998 World Series Most Valuabale Player
 Jose Canseco (1983) 6 × MLB All-Star; 2 × MLB home run leader (1988, 1991); 1986 AL Rookie of the Year; 1988 AL Most Valuable Player
 Ron Coomer (1989) MLB All-Star
 Rick Honeycutt (1991) 2 x MLB All-Star; 1983 AL ERA Leader

 Tommy John (1985) 4 x MLB All-Star
 Luis Polonia (1984)

 Darren Lewis (1988)
 Terry Steinbach (1984) 3 x MLB All-Star
 Todd Van Poppel (1990) 1990 #1 Overall Draft Pick
 Walt Weiss (1986) MLB All-Star; 1988 AL Rookie of the Year

References

Defunct Midwest League teams
Professional baseball teams in Wisconsin
Sports in Madison, Wisconsin
Oakland Athletics minor league affiliates
Defunct baseball teams in Wisconsin
Baseball teams disestablished in 1993
Baseball teams established in 1982
1982 establishments in Wisconsin
1993 disestablishments in Wisconsin